"Shake That" (also known as "Shake That Ass") is the second and final single taken from American rapper Eminem's first compilation album, Curtain Call: The Hits (2005), following "When I'm Gone". Featuring Nate Dogg, it is one of three new songs featured on the album.

Song information
The music video is animated. The single was released in early 2006 in the United States where it peaked at No. 6. In the UK, the song was released as a download-only single in April 2006, peaking at No. 28 on the UK Download Chart.

Remix
A remixed version of the song, with Nate Dogg, Obie Trice and Bobby Creekwater, appears on Eminem Presents: The Re-Up (2006). Eminem does not have a verse on the remix; he does, however, still rap the intro to the song.

Critical reception
AllMusic wrote a mixed opinion: "sex song that finds Shady sounding as if he's drifting along in his own orbit. "Shake That" has an incongruous Nate Dogg crooning the chorus." Pitchfork thinks that this song is just another "lesser version of Eminem songs that already piss me (critic) off." IGN called it a "rump mover" and wrote a positive review: "a booty shaker, again showing promise in Em's production. It's still a pretty simple bump-n-shuffle number, but it swings with a sense of upbeat minimalism and takes his trademark dark sounds into a slightly lighter venue." Sputnik Music wasn't satisfied: "Shake That features Nate Dogg, and is the quintessential club banger". Rolling Stone called this song a "Nate Dogg throwaway".

"Shake That" was nominated for "Best Rap/Sung Collaboration" at the 49th Annual Grammy Awards, but it lost to Justin Timberlake and T.I.'s "My Love". "Shake That" was certified gold in Sweden, and platinum in Denmark, both due to strong digital downloads.

Awards and nominations

Track listing
Digital download

Promotional CD single

12" vinyl

Notes
 signifies an additional producer.

Charts

Weekly charts

Year-end charts

Certifications

References

External links

 Music  for "Shake That"

2005 songs
2006 singles
Aftermath Entertainment singles
Animated music videos
Eminem songs
Nate Dogg songs
Dirty rap songs
Interscope Records singles
Shady Records singles
Song recordings produced by Eminem
Songs written by Nate Dogg
Internet memes introduced in 2016
Songs about alcohol
Songs about drugs
Songs about cannabis